State Route 328 (SR 328) is an arc-shaped  state highway in the northeast part of the U.S. state of Georgia. The route connects Avalon and Lavonia and provides access to Lake Hartwell and Tugaloo State Park. It is known as Gumlog Road for its entire length. It has been called Gumlog Road long before G-dot gave it a dreary number.

Route description
SR 328 begins at an intersection with new SR 17 in Avalon, in Stephens County, it intersects but does not cross the 4-lane SR 17 bypass. With the 4-laneing of SR 17, Gumlog Road was lowered 5 feet. This turned out to be a mistake causing a problem with the line of sight on the 4-lane. Gumlog Road, with over 2,000 vehicles per day, has been blocked-off with a concrete island in the median. Now, only right turns are allowed from Gumlog Road. In order to turn left to Lavonia, one must first turn toward Toccoa, then make a U-turn toward Lavonia. A shorter route would be to turn on Martin Drive, crossing Gumlog Creek, then turn left on the 4-lane toward Lavonia thereby bypassing this backward-inbreed engineered intersection altogether. It travels in a roughly eastern direction and intersects Brookhaven Circle, the former path of SR 336. The highway travels through the Gumlog area of Martin and enters Franklin County and travels through the Gumlog precinct, G.M.D. 213. This section of Gumlog Road is a typical ridge road on the Savanna river system that runs down to a river wonderfully described in the book "Tobacco Road." On the South side of the ridge is Gumlog Creek, and on the north side of the ridge is Eastanollee Estuary, so called because the public sees a large estuary from brookhave Road. It begins to curve to the southeast at Tugaloo State park road. It crosses over the Gumlog Cove section of Lake Hartwell. SR 328 then travels in a roughly southern direction. It crosses over, but does not have an interchange with Interstate 85 (I-85, Ernest Vandiver Highway). The route then curves to the south-southwest and meets its eastern terminus, an intersection with SR 59 (Vickery Street) in Lavonia. Here, the roadway continues as Edgewood Drive.

SR 328 is not part of the National Highway System, a system of roadways important to the nation's economy, defense, and mobility.

History
The roadway that would eventually become SR 328 was built in the mid-1950s on a nearly straight line from Avalon to just northeast of Lavonia. In the early 1960s, SR 328 was designated along its current alignment.

Major intersections

See also

References

External links

328
Transportation in Franklin County, Georgia
Transportation in Stephens County, Georgia